Liu Zixu is a Chinese biathlete who competed at the 2022 Winter Paralympics.

Career
Liu represented China at the 2022 Winter Paralympics and won a gold medal in the men's 6 kilometres men's sprint Sitting Para Biathlon. This was China's first gold medal at the 2022 Winter Paralympics, and their second-ever Winter Paralympics gold. He also won a bronze medal in the men's 12.5 kilometres event.

References 

Living people
Biathletes at the 2022 Winter Paralympics
Medalists at the 2022 Winter Paralympics
Paralympic gold medalists for China
Paralympic bronze medalists for China
Paralympic medalists in biathlon
Year of birth missing (living people)
21st-century Chinese people